James Hinton may refer to:

James Hinton (surgeon) (1822–1875), English surgeon and author 
James Sidney Hinton (1834–1892), Indiana legislator, first African American in that role
James E. Hinton (c. 1937–2006), American cinematographer
James Hinton (musician) (born 1988), American musician known as "The Range"

See also
James Hinton House, Missouri